Nipuni Rasanjali (born 28 November 1999) is a Sri Lankan rugby sevens player.

Rasanjali was selected in Sri Lanka's squad for the 2022 Commonwealth Games in Birmingham, they finished eighth overall.

References 

Living people
1999 births
Female rugby sevens players
Sri Lanka international women's rugby sevens players
Rugby sevens players at the 2022 Commonwealth Games